Joyce Frankland Academy, Newport, formerly Newport Free Grammar School, is a school in Newport, Essex, England. It was founded in 1588. The school is a mixed secondary school with a sixth form.  It previously existed in different forms including a boarding school and a grammar school. The headteacher is Duncan Roberts and the vice headteacher is Ian Stoneham. As of 2012, there were 987 students, including 160 in the sixth form.

It takes its current name after Dame Joyce Frankland (1531-1588), the only daughter of goldsmith Robert Trappes, who founded it as the "free Grammer Schole of Newport". Dame Frankland also made a number of educational bequests in her will to colleges at the universities of Oxford and Cambridge.

Specialist and academy status
The school achieved Specialist Language College status in July 2003 from DfES and has been a Language College since September 2003. The school achieved a second specialism in Science, commencing 1 September 2008 but this was later lost.

The school converted to academy status on 1 September 2012.

Academic standards
In 2011, Newport Free Grammar School was ranked 405th out of the 429 institutions supplying A-Level results to the Daily Telegraph's annual league table based on the percentages of A*, A and B grades achieved.

Following an inspection on 15 March 2006, Ofsted rated the school as good, the second-best grade on its four-point scale. Inspectors said teaching was "sometimes outstanding, even inspirational" in languages and the humanities but needed improvement in mathematics and IT.

Notable former pupils

 Max Barrett, morbid anatomist and histologist
 Charles George Broyden, mathematician
 Martin Caton, MP for Gower
 Jimmy Doherty, BBC broadcaster and farmer
 Paul Epworth, music producer
 James Frain, film actor
 Matt Holland, Republic of Ireland footballer
 Kate Johnson, novelist
 Shakila Karim, singer-songwriter and musician
 Jamie Oliver, television chef and author
 J. W. Pritchard, civil servant of the Indian civil service
 Pip Pyle, drummer with Gong and Hatfield and the North
 Laura Sugar, Paralympic athlete
 David Sutton, archivist and local politician
 Peter Warren, journalist

References

External links
 

Secondary schools in Essex
Educational institutions established in the 1580s
1588 establishments in England
Academies in Essex
Newport, Essex
Specialist language colleges in England